Zambia at the 2006 Commonwealth Games in Melbourne.

Athletics 

Men
Track & road events

Women
Track & road events

Cycling

Road 
 Men

Lawn bowls

Men

Women

Weightlifting

Men

References

Sport in Zambia
Nations at the 2006 Commonwealth Games
Commonwealth Games
Zambia at the Commonwealth Games